Tahera Qutbuddin (born 1964, Bombay) is a professor of Arabic literature at the University of Chicago. A Guggenheim Fellow (2020) and a winner of the Sheikh Zayed Book Award in 2021, she is best known for her works on Arabic oratory and the usage of Arabic in India, especially in the Dawoodi Bohra tradition.

Life
Tahera Qutbuddin was born in Bombay in 1964 in a Dawoodi Bohra family. Syedna Mohammed Burhanuddin, a leader of the Bohra community, was a relative. She attended Villa Theresa High School and Sophia College for Women, where she completed her secondary education in 1984.

Qutbuddin learned Arabic from her father Khuzaima Qutbuddin. She received a bachelor's degree (1988) and a tamhidi magister (1990) from the Ain Shams University, Cairo, followed by master's (1994) and doctoral degrees from Harvard University (1999), where her advisor was Wolfhart Heinrichs.

Career
In 2002, Qutbuddin joined the Department of Near Eastern Languages and Civilizations of the University of Chicago. She was made a Carnegie Scholar in 2008 and a Guggenheim fellow (2020).

Among her early publications was a study of the Arabic language in India, especially among the Dawoodi Bohras, and its influence on the Gujarati language sermons of Taher Fakhruddin. 

Qutbuddin's 2005 monograph Al-Mu˒ayyad al-Shirāzī and Fāṭimid Da˓wa Poetry. A Case of Commitment in Classical Arabic Literature expanded on her doctoral thesis of 1999. It was deemed especially important for its access to private manuscripts of the Tayyibi Ismaili Da˓wa in India. She showed that Al-Mu˒ayyad al-Shirāzī was a major innovator in the development of committed literature, i.e., literature produced by someone convinced of a particular ideology who then seeks to persuade society of its truth. She showed that Fatimid poetry prior to al-Shirāzī was stylistically and thematically similar to that of the Abbasids, whose main exponents were panegyrists, whereas al-Shirāzī's works were entirely in the promotion of the Da˓wa. She also showed how the traditions of the Tayyibi Ismailis moved to Yemen and thereafter in India after the death of al-Shirāzī, where his poetry's influence on the Dawoodi Bohra community endures to present times.

In 2013, Qutbuddin published an edition of her translations of Al-Qāḍī Al-Quḍāʿī's collection of the sayings and sermons of Imam Ali and Al-Jāḥiẓ's selection of proverbs attributed to Ali. It was considered a definitive work as it considered all available editions and manuscripts, unlike previous translations of these important examples of Islamic religious literature. In particular, she was lauded for the quality of the translations, which conveyed well the punchiness of the pithy Arabic expressions and the variations in their meanings.

Qutbuddin's book Arabic Oration – Art and Function (2019) traced Arabic literature from its oral origins to its influence on modern sermons. She created a comparative framework between Arabic and Greek oratory, and explored how oratory was the foundation for the shaping of politics and public speaking, and thence to literature. She had worked on it for over a decade, although she had had the idea for it during her undergraduate days in Cairo. She explored the cultural milieu around Imam Ali and the aesthetics of his sermons. She established that public preaching in the form of khutbah popular till today stemmed from pre-Islamic oratory, with texts available from decades before the founding of the faith. Much of the orally transmitted literature was lost but several texts in Arabic survive. The oratory depended much on visual imagery, but especially on rhythm and similar grammatical structure in every line, serving to reinforce the message in the listeners' minds. Qutbuddin also found that women held important positions in early Islamic society but would be permitted to speak publicly only in times of acute troubles. An example was the declamation by Imam Ali's daughter Zaynab who, following the defeat of Ali's descendants at the Battle of Karbala, castigated the victor, Yazid I, for his actions.

In 2021, Qutbuddin was working on a monograph on Imam Ali, the fourth caliph of Islam, titled ʿAli ibn Abi Talib: Life, Teachings, and Eloquence of the Sage of Islam. Ali is considered a master guide for life on earth and in heaven by both Sunnis and Shiites; his orations exemplary and beautiful, with ornate, difficult vocabulary. Qutbuddin focussed on the interrelationships between political, religious and literary aspects of his life, aiming to reconstruct his life.

Selected works

References

Bibliography
 
 
 
 
 
 
 
 
 

1964 births
Living people
People from Mumbai
American academics of Indian descent
Harvard University alumni
University of Chicago faculty
Sophia College for Women alumni
Dawoodi Bohras
Ain Shams University alumni
American Islamic studies scholars
Women scholars of Islam
Shia scholars of Islam